For the Wales international of the 1980s see Steve Jones (rugby player born 1951)

Steve Jones (born 20 April 1977) is a former Wales international rugby union player. A hooker, he attained 5 international caps for the Wales national rugby union team.

Jones, who was born in Neath, was first capped for Wales against Japan in 2001. He played club rugby for Newport Gwent Dragons for 10 years and set the record for the most caps for the region with 180.

On 17 April 2013 Jones confirmed his retirement after a long struggle with a hip injury.

References

External links
Newport Gwent Dragons profile
Wales profile

Dragons RFC players
Welsh rugby union players
Wales international rugby union players
1977 births
Living people
Rugby union players from Neath
Rugby union hookers